Gregory is an unincorporated community in Little Falls Township, Morrison County, Minnesota, United States, near Little Falls.  The community is located near the intersection of 123rd Street and Haven Road, Morrison County Road 76.

U.S. Highway 10 and 1st Street SE are also in the immediate area.

The community was named for J. Gregory Smith, a railroad official.

References

Unincorporated communities in Morrison County, Minnesota
Unincorporated communities in Minnesota